Sântana de Mureș is a commune in Mureș County, Transylvania, Romania, composed of four villages:

History

Ancient times 

The Sântana de Mureș-Chernyakhov culture which flourished between the 2nd and 5th centuries AD in Eastern Europe was named after the sites discovered at Sântana de Mureș and at Cherniakhiv in Ukraine. The culture was spread across what today constitutes Ukraine, Romania, Moldova, and parts of Belarus. It probably corresponds to the Gothic kingdom of Oium as described by Jordanes in his work Getica, but it is nonetheless the result of a poly-ethnic cultural mélange of the Gothic, Getae-Dacian, Sarmatian and Slavic populations of the area.

Modern times

Sântana de Mureș was part of the Székely Land region of Transylvania. Until 1918, the village belonged to the Maros-Torda County of the Kingdom of Hungary. After the Treaty of Trianon of 1920, it became part of Romania.

Demographics
The commune has an ethnically mixed population, with a Romanian majority: according to the 2011 Romanian census, it has a population of 5,723 of which 50.1% are Romanians, 40.3% are Hungarians and 6.8% are Roma.

Natives
Ion Chinezu

See also
 Sântana de Mureș-Chernyakhov culture
 List of Hungarian exonyms (Mureș County)

Gallery

References

Communes in Mureș County
Localities in Transylvania